A going concern is a business that is assumed will meet its financial obligations when they become due. It functions without the threat of liquidation for the foreseeable future, which is usually regarded as at least the next 12 months or the specified accounting period (the longer of the two).  The presumption of going concern for the business implies the basic declaration of intention to keep operating its activities at least for the next year, which is a basic assumption for preparing financial statements that comprehend the conceptual framework of the IFRS. Hence, a declaration of going concern means that the business has neither the intention nor the need to liquidate or to materially curtail the scale of its operations.

Continuation of an entity as a going concern is presumed as the basis for financial reporting unless and until the entity's liquidation becomes imminent. Preparation of financial statements under this presumption is commonly referred to as the going concern basis of accounting. If and when an entity's liquidation becomes imminent, financial statements are prepared under the liquidation basis of accounting (Financial Accounting Standards Board, 2014).

Definition
The going concern assumption is universally understood and accepted by accounting professionals; however, it has never been formally incorporated into U.S. GAAP. In October 2008, FASB issued an Exposure Draft called "Going Concern." It discusses the following possible pronouncements for the going concern:
 Reconsideration of defining and incorporating the terms going concern and substantial doubt into U.S. GAAP
 The time horizon over which management would evaluate the entity's ability to meet its obligations
 The type of information that management should consider in evaluating the entity's ability to meet its obligations
 The effect of subsequent events on management's evaluation of the entity's ability to meet its obligations
 Whether to provide guidance on the liquidation basis of accounting

A current definition of the going concern assumption can be found in the AICPA Statement on Auditing Standards No.1 Codification of Auditing Standards and Procedures, Section 341, “The Auditor’s Consideration of an Entity’s Ability to Continue as a Going Concern” (AU Section 341). The "going concern" concept assumes that the business will remain in existence long enough for all the assets of the business to be fully utilized. Utilized assets means obtaining the complete benefit from their earning potential (i.e. if you recently purchased equipment costing $5,000 that had 5 years of productive/useful life, then under the going concern assumption, the accountant would only write off one year's value $1,000 (1/5th) this year, leaving $4,000 to be treated as a fixed asset with future economic value for the business).

Accounting

The going concern principle allows the company to defer some of its prepaid expenses until future accounting periods. The going concern assumption is a fundamental assumption in the preparation of financial statements. Under the going concern assumption, an entity is ordinarily viewed as continuing in business for the foreseeable future with neither the intention nor the necessity of liquidation, ceasing trading or seeking protection from creditors pursuant to laws or regulations. Accordingly, unless the going concern assumption is inappropriate in the circumstances of the entity, assets and liabilities are recorded on the basis that the entity will be able to realize its assets, discharge its liabilities, and obtain refinancing (if necessary) in the normal course of business.

An entity is assumed to be a going concern in the absence of significant information to the contrary. An example of such contrary information is an entity's inability to meet its obligations as they come due without substantial asset sales or debt restructurings. If such were not the case, an entity would essentially be acquiring assets with the intention of closing its operations and reselling the assets to another party.

If the accountant believes that an entity may no longer be a going concern, then this brings up the issue of whether its assets are impaired, which may call for the write-down of their carrying amount to their liquidation value, and/or the recognition of liabilities that arise on account of the entity's imminent closure (which may not arise otherwise). Thus, the value of an entity that is assumed to be a going concern is higher than its breakup value, since a going concern can potentially continue to earn profits.

The going concern concept is not clearly defined anywhere in generally accepted accounting principles, and so is subject to a considerable amount of interpretation regarding when an entity should report it. However, generally accepted auditing standards (GAAS) do instruct an auditor regarding the consideration of an entity's ability to continue as a going concern.

The auditor evaluates an entity's ability to continue as a going concern for a period not less than one year following the date of the financial statements being audited (a longer period may be considered if the auditor believes such extended period to be relevant). The auditor considers such items as negative trends in operating results, loan defaults, denial of trade credit from suppliers uneconomical long-term commitments, and legal proceedings in deciding if there is a substantial doubt about an entity's ability to continue as a going concern. If so, the auditor must draw attention to the uncertainty regarding the entity's ability to continue as a going concern, in their auditor's report. On the other hand, inappropriate use of the going concern assumption by an entity may cause the auditor to issue an adverse opinion on the financial statements. This Guidance provides a framework to assist directors, audit committees and finance teams in determining whether it is appropriate to adopt the going concern basis for preparing financial statements and in making balanced, proportionate and clear disclosures. Separate standards and guidance have been issued by the Auditing Practices Board to address the work of auditors in relation to going concern.

Assumption
Under the going concern assumption, an entity is viewed as continuing in business for the foreseeable future. General purpose financial statements are prepared on a going concern basis, unless management either intends to liquidate the entity or to cease operations, or has no realistic alternative but to do so. Special purpose financial statements may or may not be prepared in accordance with a financial reporting framework for which the going concern basis is relevant (for example, the going concern basis is not relevant for some financial statements prepared on a tax basis in particular jurisdictions). When the use of the going concern assumption is appropriate, assets and liabilities are recorded on the basis that the entity will be able to realize its assets and discharge its liabilities in the normal course of business.

Auditing
Continuation of an entity as a going concern is assumed in financial reporting in the absence of significant information to the contrary. Ordinarily, information that significantly contradicts the going concern assumption relates to the entity's inability to continue to meet its obligations as they become due without substantial disposition of assets outside the ordinary course of business, restructuring of debt, externally forced revisions of its operations, or similar actions.

Responsibilities
The auditor has a responsibility to evaluate whether there is substantial doubt about the entity's ability to continue as a going concern for a reasonable period of time, not to exceed one year beyond the date of the financial statements being audited (hereinafter referred to as a reasonable period of time). The auditor's evaluation is based on his or her knowledge of relevant conditions and events that exist at or have occurred prior to the date of the auditor's report. Information about such conditions or events is obtained from the application of auditing procedures planned and performed to achieve audit objectives that are related to management's assertions embodied in the financial statements being audited, as described in Auditing Standard No. 15, Audit Evidence.

The auditor should evaluate whether there is substantial doubt about the entity's ability to continue as a going concern for a reasonable period of time in the following manner:

The auditor considers whether the results of his procedures performed in planning, gathering evidential matter relative to the various audit objectives, and completing the audit identify conditions and events that, when considered in the aggregate, indicate there could be substantial doubt about the entity's ability to continue as a going concern for a reasonable period of time. It may be necessary to obtain additional information about such conditions and events, as well as the appropriate evidential matter to support information that mitigates the auditor's doubt.

If the auditor believes there is substantial doubt about the entity's ability to continue as a going concern for a reasonable period of time, he should obtain information about management's plans that are intended to mitigate the effect of such conditions or events, and assess the likelihood that such plans can be effectively implemented.

After the auditor has evaluated management's plans, he concludes whether he has substantial doubt about the entity's ability to continue as a going concern for a reasonable period of time. If the auditor concludes there is substantial doubt, he should consider the adequacy of disclosure about the entity's possible inability to continue as a going concern for a reasonable period of time, and include an explanatory paragraph (following the opinion paragraph) in his audit report to reflect his conclusion. If the auditor concludes that substantial doubt does not exist, he should consider the need for disclosure.

The auditor is not responsible for predicting future conditions or events. The fact that the entity may cease to exist as a going concern subsequent to receiving a report from the auditor that does not refer to substantial doubt, even within one year following the date of the financial statements, does not, in itself, indicate inadequate performance by the auditor. Accordingly, the absence of reference to substantial doubt in an auditor's report should not be viewed as providing assurance as to an entity's ability to continue as a going concern.

Procedures
It is not necessary to design audit procedures solely to identify conditions and events that, when considered in the aggregate, indicate there could be substantial doubt about the entity's ability to continue as a going concern for a reasonable period of time. The results of auditing procedures designed and performed to achieve other audit objectives should be sufficient for that purpose. The following are examples of procedures that may identify such conditions and events:
Analytical procedures
Review of subsequent events
Review of compliance with the terms of debt and loan agreements
Reading of minutes of meetings of stockholders, board of directors, and important committees of the board
Inquiry of an entity's legal counsel about litigation, claims, and assessments
Confirmation with related and third parties of the details of arrangements to provide or maintain financial support

Conditions and events
In performing audit procedures such as those presented in paragraph .05, the auditor may identify information about certain conditions or events that, when considered in the aggregate, indicate there could be substantial doubt about the entity's ability to continue as a going concern for a reasonable period of time. The significance of such conditions and events will depend on the circumstances, and some may have significance only when viewed in conjunction with others. The following are examples of such conditions and events:

Negative trends—for example, recurring operating losses, working capital deficiencies, negative cash flows from operating activities, adverse key financial ratios

Other indications of possible financial difficulties—for example, default on loan or similar agreements, arrearages in dividends, denial of usual trade credit from suppliers, restructuring of debt, noncompliance with statutory capital requirements, need to seek new sources or methods of financing or to dispose of substantial assets

Internal matters—for example, work stoppages or other labor difficulties, substantial dependence on the success of a particular project, uneconomic long-term commitments, need to significantly revise operations

External matters that have occurred—for example, legal proceedings, legislation, or similar matters that might jeopardize an entity's ability to operate; loss of a key franchise, license, or patent; loss of a principal customer or supplier; uninsured or underinsured catastrophe such as a drought, earthquake, or flood.

Management's plans
If, after considering the identified conditions and events in the aggregate, the auditor believes there is substantial doubt about the ability of the entity to continue as a going concern for a reasonable period of time, he should consider management's plans for dealing with the adverse effects of the conditions and events. The auditor should obtain information about the plans and consider whether it is likely the adverse effects will be mitigated for a reasonable period of time and that such plans can be effectively implemented. The auditor's considerations relating to management plans may include the following:

Plans to dispose of assets
Restrictions on disposal of assets, such as covenants limiting such transactions in loan or similar agreements or encumbrances against assets
Apparent marketability of assets that management plans to sell
Possible direct or indirect effects of disposal of assets
Plans to borrow money or restructure debt
Availability of debt financing, including existing or committed credit arrangements, such as lines of credit or arrangements for factoring receivables or sale-leaseback of assets
Existing or committed arrangements to restructure or subordinate debt or to guarantee loans to the entity
Possible effects on management's borrowing plans of existing restrictions on additional borrowing or the sufficiency of available collateral
Plans to reduce or delay expenditures
Apparent feasibility of plans to reduce overhead or administrative expenditures, to postpone maintenance or research and development projects, or to lease rather than purchase assets
Possible direct or indirect effects of reduced or delayed expenditures
Plans to increase ownership equity
Apparent feasibility of plans to increase ownership equity, including existing or committed arrangements to raise additional capital
Existing or committed arrangements to reduce current dividend requirements or to accelerate cash distributions from affiliates or other investors
When evaluating management's plans, the auditor should identify those elements that are particularly significant to overcoming the adverse effects of the conditions and events and should plan and perform auditing procedures to obtain evidential matter about them. For example, the auditor should consider the adequacy of support regarding the ability to obtain additional financing or the planned disposal of assets.

When prospective financial information is particularly significant to management's plans, the auditor should request management to provide that information and should consider the adequacy of support for significant assumptions underlying that information. The auditor should give particular attention to assumptions that are—
Material to the prospective financial information.
Especially sensitive or susceptible to change.
Inconsistent with historical trends.
The auditor's consideration should be based on knowledge of the entity, its business, and its management and should include (a) reading of the prospective financial information and the underlying assumptions and (b) comparing prospective financial information in prior periods with actual results and comparing prospective information for the current period with results achieved to date. If the auditor becomes aware of factors, the effects of which are not reflected in such prospective financial information, he should discuss those factors with management and, if necessary, request revision of the prospective financial information.

Financial statement effects
When, after considering management's plans, the auditor concludes there is substantial doubt about the entity's ability to continue as a going concern for a reasonable period of time, the auditor should consider the possible effects on the financial statements and the adequacy of the related disclosure. Some of the information that might be disclosed includes—
Pertinent conditions and events giving rise to the assessment of substantial doubt about the entity's ability to continue as a going concern for a reasonable period of time.
The possible effects of such conditions and events.
Management's evaluation of the significance of those conditions and events and any mitigating factors.
Possible discontinuance of operations.
Management's plans (including relevant prospective financial information). fn 3
Information about the recoverability or classification of recorded asset amounts or the amounts or classification of liabilities.
When, primarily because of the auditor's consideration of management's plans, he concludes that substantial doubt about the entity's ability to continue as a going concern for a reasonable period of time is alleviated, he should consider the need for disclosure of the principal conditions and events that initially caused him to believe there was substantial doubt. The auditor's consideration of disclosure should include the possible effects of such conditions and events, and any mitigating factors, including management's plans.

Effects on the auditor's report
If, after considering identified conditions and events and management's plans, the auditor concludes that substantial doubt about the entity's ability to continue as a going concern for a reasonable period of time remains, the audit report should include an explanatory paragraph (following the opinion paragraph) to reflect that conclusion. fn 4 (?) The auditor's conclusion about the entity's ability to continue as a going concern should be expressed through the use of the phrase "substantial doubt about its (the entity's) ability to continue as a going concern" [or similar wording that includes the terms substantial doubt and going concern] as illustrated in paragraph .13. [As amended, effective for reports issued after December 31, 1990, by Statement on Auditing Standards No. 64.]

An example follows of an explanatory paragraph (following the opinion paragraph) in the auditor's report describing an uncertainty about the entity's ability to continue as a going concern for a reasonable period of time.

The accompanying financial statements have been prepared assuming that the Company will continue as a going concern. As discussed in Note X to the financial statements, the Company has suffered recurring losses from operations and has a net capital deficiency that raise substantial doubt about its ability to continue as a going concern. Management's plans in regard to these matters are also described in Note X. The financial statements do not include any adjustments that might result from the outcome of this uncertainty.

[As amended, effective for reports issued after December 31, 1990, by Statement on Auditing Standards No. 64.]

If the auditor concludes that the entity's disclosures with respect to the entity's ability to continue as a going concern for a reasonable period of time are inadequate, a departure from generally accepted accounting principles exists. This may result in either a qualified (except for) or an adverse opinion. Reporting guidance for such situations is provided in section 508, Reports on Audited Financial Statements.

Substantial doubt about the entity's ability to continue as a going concern for a reasonable period of time that arose in the current period does not imply that a basis for such doubt existed in the prior period and, therefore, should not affect the auditor's report on the financial statements of the prior period that are presented on a comparative basis. When financial statements of one or more prior periods are presented on a comparative basis with financial statements of the current period, reporting guidance is provided in section 508.

If substantial doubt about the entity's ability to continue as a going concern for a reasonable period of time existed at the date of prior period financial statements that are presented on a comparative basis, and that doubt has been removed in the current period, the explanatory paragraph included in the auditor's report (following the opinion paragraph) on the financial statements of the prior period should not be repeated.

Exceptions
Because the issuance of a going-concern opinion is feared to be a self-fulfilling prophecy, auditors may be reluctant to issue one. A going-concern opinion may lower stockholders’ and creditors’ confidence in the company; ratings agencies may then downgrade the debt, leading to an inability to obtain new capital and an increase in the cost of existing capital. In 1978, the AICPA formed an independent commission (the Cohen Commission) that issued a report expressing this sentiment:

Creditors often regard a subject to qualification as a separate reason for not granting a loan, a reason in addition to the circumstances creating the uncertainty that caused the qualification. This frequently puts the auditor in the position, in effect, of deciding whether a company is able to obtain the funds it needs to continue operating. Thus, the auditor's qualification tends to be a self-fulfilling prophecy. The auditor's expression of uncertainty about the company's ability to continue may contribute to making it a certainty.

The fear is that a going-concern opinion can hasten the demise of an already troubled company, reduce a loan officer's willingness to grant a line of credit to that troubled company, or increase the point spread that would be charged if that company were granted a loan. Auditors are placed at the center of a moral and ethical dilemma: whether to issue a going-concern opinion and risk escalating the financial distress of their client, or not issue a going-concern opinion and risk not informing interested parties of the possible failure of the company. The hope is that issuing a going-concern opinion might promote timelier rescue activity.

Another, more troubling reason that auditors might fail to issue a going-concern opinion has been alluded to by the mainstream media in the WorldCom and Enron business failures: lack of auditor independence. Management determines the auditor's tenure and remuneration. The threat of receiving a going-concern modification may send management to another auditor, in a phenomenon referred to as “opinion shopping.” Moreover, in an extreme case of a self-fulfilling prophecy, if the client does go bankrupt, the auditor loses future audit fees. This fear of losing future fees could compromise the auditor's ability to render an unbiased opinion on a client's financial statements.

The Private Securities Litigation Reform Act of 1995 made it much more difficult for a plaintiff to bring suit successfully against a company's auditors. While the act did codify as law the reporting requirements of SAS 59, it also made it more difficult for a plaintiff's attorneys to successfully pursue class-action litigation against auditors. Furthermore, in cases where auditors did fail to modify their audit opinions in accordance with SAS 59, the damage awards were limited to proportionate liability. When comparing the potential costs of issuing a going-concern opinion (hastening the demise of the client; losing audit fees) to the costs of not issuing a going-concern opinion (litigation), the result of the act was essentially to tip the scales in favor of not issuing a going-concern opinion. Since the act was passed, high-profile litigation citing the auditors’ failure to issue a going-concern opinion, such as the class-action lawsuits by Kmart's shareholders against PricewaterhouseCoopers, and Adelphia's against Deloitte & Touche, has been drastically reduced.

The most critical reason that auditors might fail to issue a going-concern opinion, however, could be a fundamental misunderstanding of the assumption itself.

Use in risk management
If a public or private company reports that its auditors have doubts about its ability to continue as a going concern, investors may take that as a sign of increased risk, although an emphasis of matter paragraph in an audit report does not necessarily indicate that a company is on the verge of insolvency. Despite this, some fund managers may be required to sell the stock to maintain an appropriate level of risk in their portfolios. A negative judgment may also result in the breach of bank loan covenants or lead a debt rating firm to lower the rating on the company's debt, making the cost of existing debt increase and/or preventing the company from obtaining additional debt financing. Because of such responses to expressed concerns by auditors, in the 1970s, the American Institute of Certified Public Accountants' Cohen commission concluded that an auditor's expression of uncertainty about the entity's ability to continue as a going concern "tends to be a self-fulfilling prophecy. The auditor's expression of uncertainty about the company's ability to continue may contribute to making its failure a certainty." Businesses should also communicate with business advisors as well as their auditors in the time of trouble. Communication can let advisors and auditors help when needed. They can help business review their internal risk management along with other internal controls.

See also
 [Source 2012 PCAOB Survey] If it is concluded by either the independent auditor, or management or both that the company may not be a going concern, what disclosures should be provided to investors?
 A reasonably detailed discussion of the company's ability to generate sufficient cash to support its operations during at least the twelve months from the date of the financial statements. Expected courses of action that bear on financial flexibility of the company such as:
[Note: Search for this discussion in three locations: Auditor's report, Management discussion and analysis and Notes to financial statements. The going concert opinion is forward looking, therefore its highly suggested that 10-K and 10-Q reports be searched on the term "Risk Factor" for important forward looking risk disclosures. For abbreviated background see: Reg S-K Item 503 and 10-K Risk Factors]
 New borrowings. (See topics such as Financial distress, Distressed lending, Death spiral financing, Factoring, debt restructuring, Debt, Loan, Money markets)
 Raising of new capital. (See Capital market, Financial capital)
 Liquidating of assets. (See Liquidation value, Fire sale)
 Reducing costs. (See Cost reduction)
 Reducing dividends. (See Dividend)
 Reducing levels of services or products. (See Restructuring, Layoff)
 Filing for bankruptcy
 Going concern status is typically tightly related to, and intertwined with, an issuers deteriorating credit rating(s)
 Corporate credit ratings
 Credit rating agency and Criticism
 Concentration of large firms issuing going concern opinions has been raised as a systemic risk. See Big Four (audit firms) PwC, Deloitte, Ernst & Young, and KPMG
 Concentration of large firms issuing credit opinions has also been raised as a systemic risk. See Big Three (credit rating agencies) Standard & Poor's, Moody's Investor Service, and Fitch Ratings
 Going concern status often triggers a technical default. See discussion at Types of Default. This can mean unused lines of credit and Unsecured debt facilities dry up.
 Going concern status may become a self fulfilling prophecy

References

External links
 What is a 'going concern' in Accounting (Peter Baskerville).
 PCAOB Advisory Group Meeting

Auditing